Vladyslav Hryhorovych Helzin (born 27 August 1973) is a Ukrainian businessman, former footballer and football functionary, ex-president of FC Olimpik Donetsk. In various media his last name also spells through Russian transliteration as Gelzin. On 10 May 2016, Helzin officially retired from professional sport. Owner of the Ukrainian chain of supermarkets "Pcholka"

Career
He is the only president out of all premier league football clubs in Ukraine, who was also a field team player. Helzin is a professional football striker who played for the Ukrainian Premier League club FC Olimpik Donetsk. In 2014 he received the title of Master of Sports of Ukraine in football 

Helzin graduated from Donetsk State Institute of Health, Physical Education and Sport, in "Olympic and professional sports" and Donetsk National University, in "International Economics".

Metalurh Donetsk
From 1999 to 2001 he served as vice-president of Metalurh Donetsk.

Olimpik Donetsk
From 2001 to 2021 he served as president of Olimpik Donetsk.

Personal life
He is married and has two daughters and a son

References

External links

1973 births
Living people
Footballers from Donetsk
Party of Regions politicians
Ukrainian businesspeople
Ukrainian football chairmen and investors
Ukrainian footballers
Association football forwards
FC Mashynobudivnyk Druzhkivka players
FC Olimpik Donetsk players
FC Olimpik Donetsk
Donetsk National University alumni
Ukrainian Premier League players
Ukrainian First League players
Ukrainian Second League players